Mirzai is a religious slur used to refer to Ahmadis.

Mirzai may also refer to:
 Mirzai (garment), a garment similar to a jacket
 Mirzayi, a dance
 Ali Mirzai (disambiguation), several topics with the name

Others 
 
 Mirzahit, a village in Bashkortostan, Russia